The Love Rocks is Dreams Come True's 16th album, released on February 22, 2006.

Track listing
 Ai ga ROCK suru Teema [愛がROCKするテーマ]
 PROUD OF YOU
 Mata "tsurai" ga 1UP [また「つらい」が1UP]
 Memai [めまい]
 JET!!! ~album version~
 Aishuu no GI Joe [哀愁のGIジョー]
 SUNSHINE ~album version~
 Teiuka [ていうか]
 WIFEHOOD Sute oku densetsu PART1 ~Shufu no Sei Tsuma no Sei~ [WIFEHOOD ステ奥伝説 PART1 ～主婦の精 妻の精～]
 Uso ni Kimatteru [ウソにきまってる]
 Sora wo yomu [空を読む] ~album version~
 Nandodemo [何度でも] ~album version~
 SPOON ME, BABY ME

References

2006 albums
Dreams Come True (band) albums
Japanese-language albums